General elections were held in Papua New Guinea from 30 June 2007 to 14 July 2007.

For the first time, the election did not use first past the post (which has in the past resulted in a very volatile political system, with the election of a candidate being largely a matter of chance due to the large number of candidates), but rather Limited Preferential Voting, in which voters number their three most preferred candidates. PNG Police reported three deaths caused by election-related violence during the election period, a large decrease in the 100 deaths which occurred during the 2002 elections. 11,000 police officers and soldiers were deployed throughout the country to police the elections and keep the peace.

Originally scheduled to end on 10 July, it was decided that the elections would be extended by five days due to delays in transporting ballot boxes caused by bad weather.

Results
ABC Radio Australia reported that nearly four million votes were cast out of Papua New Guinea's population of about six million.

Early results on 15 July indicated that incumbent Prime Minister Sir Michael Somare's National Alliance Party was picking up more seats than other parties of the National Parliament of Papua New Guinea's 109 seats. Final results were largely completed by 6 August, the deadline for the return of writs. Counting in two seats was extended for a few days due to legal challenges halting the counting process. The previous deadline was 30 July, but this was extended due to delays caused by bad weather and disruption of counting by some candidates and scrutineers.

In addition to the seats won by the National Alliance Party directly, thirteen independents joined the party after the election. Together with its coalition partners (which include the People's Action Party, the United Resources Party, the Pangu Pati, the National Party, the Melanesian Liberal Party and the Melanesian Alliance Party) the National Alliance Party had the support of a substantial majority of the newly elected Members of Parliament.

A hundred women stood as candidates. Only one, Dame Carol Kidu, was elected, for the Port Moresby South constituency.

By province

Central Province

Eastern Highlands Province

East New Britain Province

East Sepik Province

Enga Province

Gulf Province

Madang Province

Manus Province

Milne Bay Province

Morobe Province

National Capital District

New Ireland Province

North Solomons (Bougainville) Province

Oro (Northern) Province

Simbu (Chimbu) Province

Southern Highlands Province

Sandaun (West Sepik) Province

Western Province

Western Highlands Province

West New Britain Province

Aftermath
On Monday 13 August 2007, the first sitting of Parliament after the election took place.  Jeffrey Nape was re-elected as Speaker of the House, and Sir Michael Somare was once again elected to be the country's Prime Minister, winning 86 votes in the 109-seat Parliament.

James Yali affair
In January 2006, James Yali, governor of Madang Province and Member of Parliament for Rai Coast Open electorate, was convicted of raping his sister-in-law and sentenced to 12 years' imprisonment.  In May 2007 he allegedly suffered a stroke and was transferred from Beon jail to hospital and placed under guard. A group of supporters and relatives then reportedly retrieved him from hospital by force and escorted him to the office of the Electoral Commission, where he completed an application to stand as an independent candidate for his previously held seat of Rai Coast Open. Despite a recent constitutional amendment that disallows anyone convicted of an indictable offence from running for office, the Electoral Commission accepted his candidacy on the basis that his legal appeal was still underway.  This decision later attracted considerable criticism.  He remained in hospital until 7 July, conducting his campaign from his hospital bed.

In the 2007 general election, Yali won the Rai Coast Open seat from a field of 28 candidates.  His level of support, despite being imprisoned, was widely attributed to fear of his reputation for sorcery.

On 10 August, the Supreme Court quashed Yali's appeal, nullifying his election.   The Electoral Commission said that a by-election for Rai Coast Open would be held within three months.  The court was widely criticised for having deliberated on the case for a year, given that a by-election would have been avoided had the court come to a decision before the election.

The by-election was held from 10–16 November 2007. His brother, John Tuna Yali, contested the election and stated that he was confident he would win. A total of 21 candidates contested the by-election. The election may have been delayed in some areas for a few days due to weather problems, but by 20 November 2007 voting had been completed in most areas. For the first time, the ballots were counted electronically; writs were returned on 7 December 2007. The by-election was won by Kiap Niuro Toko Sapia with 6,961 votes, while Henry Baiyema was runner-up with 4,503 votes. Sapia contested the election as an independent after having contested the general election as a PNG Country Party candidate; he announced he would join the National Alliance Party.

References

Elections in Papua New Guinea
Papua
Parliamentary election
National Parliament of Papua New Guinea
Election and referendum articles with incomplete results
Landslide victories